Corwin was a small settlement in Henry County, Indiana, United States.  Established in the mid 19th century, the site was little more than a station along the Pittsburgh, Cincinnati and St. Louis Railway and never saw significant development.  Though the railroad (now operated as the Connersville and New Castle Railroad) still persists, no other trace of Corwin remains.

Geography
Corwin is located at  (39.887840, -85.301810) at an elevation of approximately 1100 feet, and is in Liberty Township.

External links
 Corwin (inhabited place)

Former populated places in Henry County, Indiana
Former populated places in Indiana